Phulera Assembly constituency is one of constituencies of Rajasthan Legislative Assembly in the Jaipur Rural (Lok Sabha constituency).

Phulera constituency covers all voters from parts of Phulera tehsil, which include ILRC Sambhar including Sambhar Municipal Board and Phulera Municipal Board, ILRC Renwal including Kishangarh Renwal Municipal Board, ILRC Bhainslana, ILRC Narayana; and Doongari Khurd, Harsoli, Kherimilak and Ramjipura Kalan of ILRC Karansar.

References

See also 
 Member of the Legislative Assembly (India)

Jaipur district
Assembly constituencies of Rajasthan